is a train station in Hyōgo-ku, Kobe, Hyōgo Prefecture, Japan. As reflected in its name, the station is located in front of (and beneath) the Kobe central markets (中央市場).

Lines
Kobe Municipal Subway
Kaigan Line Station K05

Layout
The station has an island platform serving two tracks.

Gallery 

Railway stations in Hyōgo Prefecture
Railway stations in Japan opened in 2001